Events from the year 1884 in the United Kingdom.

Incumbents
 Monarch – Victoria
 Prime Minister – William Ewart Gladstone (Liberal)
 Parliament – 22nd

Events
 4 January – the Fabian Society is founded in London.
 5 January – Gilbert and Sullivan's comic opera Princess Ida has its première at the Savoy Theatre, London.
 18 January – Dr William Price attempts to cremate his dead baby son, Iesu Grist, at Llantrisant. Later tried at Cardiff Assizes and acquitted on the grounds that cremation is not contrary to law, he is thus able to carry out the ceremony (the first in the U.K. in modern times) on 14 March.
 26 January–29 March: the first British Home Championship is held between the football teams of England, Ireland, Scotland and Wales.
 1 February – first fascicle of what will become the Oxford English Dictionary is published.
 5 February – Derby County Football Club is founded in England.
 15 February – Emma Keyse is murdered and John 'Babbacombe' Lee is suspected.
 26 February – Fenian dynamite campaign: A bomb explodes in the left-luggage office at London Victoria station; bombs left at other London railway stations are defused.
 13 March – the Siege of Khartoum begins in the Mahdist War: General Charles Gordon is besieged in the Sudan.
 22 April – Colchester earthquake: four die in the UK's most destructive earthquake.
 29 May – Oscar Wilde marries Constance Lloyd in London.
 30 May – Fenian dynamite campaign: Three bombs explode in London: at the headquarters of the Criminal Investigation Department and the Metropolitan Police Service's Special Irish Branch; in the basement of the Carlton Club (a gentlemen's club frequented by members of the Conservative Party); and outside the home of Conservative MP Sir Watkin Williams-Wynn; ten people are injured. A fourth bomb planted at the foot of Nelson's Column fails to explode.
 1 July – First International Forestry Exhibition opens in Edinburgh.
 8 July – the NSPCC is founded as the London Society for the Prevention of Cruelty to Children.
 16 July – a locomotive axle failure causes the derailment of an express passenger train from Manchester for London at Penistone; twenty-four passengers are killed.
 22 September –  is wrecked on Tory Island, County Donegal, with the loss of 52 lives and only 6 survivors.
 28 September – the Marks & Spencer department store chain starts life as Michael Marks’ market stall in Leeds Kirkgate Market, Yorkshire.
 13 October – International Meridian Conference in Washington, D.C. fixes the Greenwich meridian as the world's prime meridian.
 18 October – University College of North Wales, Bangor founded.
 1 November – Leicester City F.C. play their first match, as Leicester Fosse Football Club.
 2 November – the "Home Office Baby" is delivered to the Home Office.
 2 November – fourteen people are killed when some of the audience at the Star Theatre, Glasgow, panics following a false fire alarm.
 4 December – Tom Dudley and Edwin Stephens are convicted of murder in the survival cannibalism case of R v. Dudley and Stephens.
 6 December – Representation of the People Act ("Third Reform Act") extends the franchise uniformly across the U.K. to all male tenants paying a £10 rental or occupying land to that value, and restricts multiple voting.
 9 December – Dudley and Stephens receive the mandatory death penalty with a recommendation for clemency and on 13 December are told that their penalties have been commuted to six months' imprisonment.

Publications
 A New English Dictionary on historical principles, part 1, edited by James A. H. Murray.
 Arthur Conan Doyle's (anonymous) story based on the disappearance of the Mary Celeste, "J. Habakuk Jephson's Statement" (Cornhill Magazine, January).
 Arnold Toynbee's lectures (collected posthumously) Lectures on the Industrial Revolution in England.

Births
 18 January – Arthur Ransome, children's author and journalist (died 1967)
 10 February – Frederick Hawksworth, mechanical engineer (died 1976)
 12 February – Norman Jewson, Arts and Crafts architect (died 1975)
 19 February – Clement Davies, Welsh politician, leader of the Liberal Party (died 1962)
 6 March – R. Williams Parry, Welsh poet (died 1956)
 13 March – Sir Hugh Walpole, novelist (died 1941)
 1 April – J. C. Squire, writer and critic (died 1958)
 10 May – Olga Petrova, English-born actress (died 1977)
 5 June – Ivy Compton-Burnett, novelist (died 1969)
 13 June – Gerald Gardner, founder of the Wiccan religion (died 1964)
 21 June
 Claude Auchinleck, field marshal (died 1981)
 Gordon Lowe, British tennis player (died 1972)
 29 June
 William Whitworth, admiral (died 1973)
 Francis Brett Young, novelist (died 1954)
 19 July 
 Maurice Nicoll, psychiatrist (died 1953)
 Charles Edward, Duke of Albany, grandson of Queen Victoria (died 1954)
 23 July – Dilly Knox, cryptanalyst (died 1943)
 10 August – Douglas Macmillan, founder of Macmillan Cancer Support (died 1969)
 6 October – MacDonald Gill, designer (died 1947)
 18 October – Manny Shinwell, politician (died 1986)
 25 November – Alexander Cadogan, diplomat (died 1968)
 17 December – Alison Uttley, children's writer (died 1976)
 19 December – Stanley Unwin, publisher (died 1968)

Deaths
 8 January – Eugenius Birch, pier engineer (born 1818)
 4 February –  Lord Edward Thynne, politician and aristocrat (born 1807)
 8 February – Montagu Bertie, 6th Earl of Abingdon, politician nd aristocrat (born 1808)
 11 February – John Hutton Balfour, botanist (born 1808)
 17 February – Charles Stuart Calverley, poet and wit (born 1831)
 1 March – Isaac Todhunter, mathematician (born 1820)
 10 March – William Blanchard Jerrold, journalist (born 1826)
 28 March – Prince Leopold, Duke of Albany, member of the royal family (born 1853)
 1 April – Marie Litton, actress (born 1847)
 5 April – John Wisden, cricketer, creator of Wisden Cricketers' Almanack (born 1826)
 11 April – Charles Reade, novelist (born 1814)
 29 April – Sir Michael Costa, conductor (born 1808 in Italy)
 29 May – Sir Henry Bartle Frere, colonial administrator (born 1815)
 15 July – Henry Wellesley, 1st Earl Cowley, diplomat (born 1804)
 23 July – Anna Mary Howitt, writer, painter and feminist (born 1822)
 6 August – Robert Spear Hudson, English businessman and philanthropist (born 1812)
 10 September – George Bentham, botanist (born 1800)
 6 November
 Henry Fawcett, statesman, economist and Postmaster General (born 1833)
 George Vane-Tempest, 5th Marquess of Londonderry, industrialist (born 1884)
 3 December – Jane C. Bonar, Scottish hymnwriter (born 1821)
 4 December – Alice Mary Smith, composer (born 1839)
 20 December – William Lindsay Alexander, church leader (born 1808)

References

 
Years of the 19th century in the United Kingdom